Joseph F. Burns served in the California State Assembly for the 23rd district. During World War I he served in the United States Army.

References

United States Army personnel of World War I
Democratic Party members of the California State Assembly
1892 births
1975 deaths